La Gaceta Mexicana was a Spanish-language newspaper published in Houston, Texas. It was one of the earliest Mexican-American newspapers in Houston.

José Sarabia first published the newspaper in 1928. A member of the Sarabia family died during the Mexican Revolution since a bandit had killed him. In order to make money in the man's absence, the family established a Mexican grocery store and established the newspaper. The newspaper closed during the first several years of the Great Depression because advertisers canceled their advertisements.

Mary Sarabia, a member of the same family, married Raul Molina, who headed the restaurant chain Molina's.

See also

 History of the Mexican-Americans in Houston

References
Esparza, Jesus Jesse. "La Colonia Mexicana: A History of Mexican Americans in Houston." (Archive) Houston History Volume 9, Issue 1. p. 2-8. Center for Public History, University of Houston.

Notes

External links
 García, María-Cristina. "La Gaceta Mexicana." Handbook of Texas.
 "Sarabia, Alfredo." Houston Area Digital Archives, Houston Public Library. February 16, 1979.
 "Mexican-American Collections." Houston Metropolitan Research Center. Houston Public Library. 2000.

Mexican-American culture in Houston
Newspapers published in Houston
1928 establishments in Texas
Publications established in 1928
Spanish-language newspapers published in Texas
Defunct newspapers published in Texas